The World We Know is an album by bandleader Stan Kenton recorded in 1967 by Capitol Records.

Reception
The Allmusic review by Lindsay Planer says "Combining divergent reworkings of pop music standards with his own undeniably unique originals, Kenton applies his trademark intricate and individual harmonic phrasings. The consistent results bear out his ability to augment his highly stylized arrangements within a framework of familiarity... While enthusiasts of the artist's work will undoubtedly be impressed, to modern ears the easy listening orchestration may seem heavy-handed, if not lackluster".

Track listing
All compositions by Stan Kenton except where noted.
 "Sunny" (Bobby Hebb) - 3:01
 "Imagine" (Francis Lai, Sammy Cahn) - 3:00
 "A Man and a Woman" (Lai, Cahn) - 4:43
 "Theme for Jo" - 3:30
 "Interchange" - 3:02 	
 "Invitation" (Bronisław Kaper, Paul Francis Webster) - 3:18
 "Girl Talk" (Neal Hefti, Bobby Troup) - 4:22
 "The World We Know" (Bert Kaempfert, Herbert Rehbein, Carl Sigman) - 2:24
 "This Hotel" (Johnny Keating, Richard Quine) - 2:32
 "Changing Times" - 3:28
 "Gloomy Sunday" (Rezső Seress, László Jávor, Sam M. Lewis) - 4:47

Recorded at Capitol Studios in Hollywood, CA on October 2, 1967 (tracks 4 & 9), October 3, 1967 (tracks 1, 6, 7 & 11) and October 4, 1967 (tracks 2, 3, 5 & 8 & 10).

Personnel
Stan Kenton - piano, conductor, arranger
Jay Daversa, Jack Laubach, Carl Leach, Clyde Raesinger, Dalton Smith - trumpet
Tom Senff, Dick Shearer, Tom Whittaker - trombone
Jim Amlotte - bass trombone
Graham Ellis - bass trombone, tuba
Ray Reed - alto saxophone, piccolo
Bob Dahl, Alan Rowe - tenor saxophone
John Mitchell - baritone saxophone
Bill Fritz - baritone saxophone, bass saxophone, flute 
Don Bagley (tracks 1, 4, 6, 7, 9 & 11), Monty Budwig (tracks 2, 3, 5 & 8 & 10) - bass 
Dee Barton - drums, arranger  
Adolpho "Chino" Valdez - bongos, congas

References

Stan Kenton albums
1967 albums
Capitol Records albums
Albums conducted by Stan Kenton

Albums recorded at Capitol Studios
Albums produced by Lee Gillette